Wheatfields is a census-designated place (CDP) in Gila County, Arizona, United States. The population was 785 at the 2010 United States Census. It is one of two places in Arizona with this name, the other being a populated place in Apache County.

Geography
Wheatfields is located in southern Gila County in the valley of Pinal Creek. Arizona State Route 188 forms the western edge of the CDP, leading northwest  to Theodore Roosevelt Lake and south  to Globe, the county seat.

Demographics

References

Census-designated places in Gila County, Arizona
Census-designated places in Arizona